A Short History of Chinese Philosophy is a book by Feng Youlan written in 1948. It is a short version of his classic 1934 book A History of Chinese Philosophy.

See also
Chinese philosophy

References
Amazon.com listing

Philosophy books
Chinese literature
Chinese philosophy
1948 non-fiction books